Ashbyburg is an unincorporated community in Hopkins County, Kentucky, United States.

History
Ashbyburg was incorporated in 1829. It was named for General Stephen Ashby.

References

Unincorporated communities in Hopkins County, Kentucky
Unincorporated communities in Kentucky